Modena, città dell'Emilia Rossa is a 1950 Italian documentary film directed by Carlo Lizzani.

Cast

External links
 

1950 films
Italian documentary films
1950s Italian-language films
1950s Italian films